John Beverley Nichols (9 September 1898 – 15 September 1983) was an English writer, playwright and public speaker. He wrote more than 60 books and plays.

Career
Between his first book, the novel, Prelude (1920) and his last, a book of poetry, Twilight (1982) Nichols wrote more than 60 books. In addition to fiction, essays, theatre scripts and children's books, he wrote non-fiction works on travel, politics, religion, cats, parapsychology, and autobiography. He contributed to many magazines and newspapers throughout his life, notably weekly columns for the London Sunday Chronicle newspaper (1932–1943) and Woman's Own magazine (1946–1967).

Nichols is best remembered for his books about his homes and gardens, the first of which, Down the Garden Path (1932), was illustrated by Rex Whistler, as were its two sequels. It went through 32 editions and has remained in print almost continuously. The trilogy chronicled the difficulties and delights of maintaining a Tudor thatched cottage in Glatton, Cambridgeshire, the village he fictionalised as Allways. The books are written in a poetic, richly creative style, evoking emotional and sensual responses, leavened with humour and irony. The three books were so popular that they led to  humorous imitations, including Mon Repos (1934) by "Nicholas Bevel" (a parody by Muriel Hine) and Garden Rubbish (1936) by W. C. Sellar and R. J. Yeatman, a satire on garden writers, which included a Nichols-like figure named "Knatchbull Twee."

Nichols's next garden and home book was Green Grows the City (1939), about his modern house and urban garden near Hampstead Heath, London. That book introduced Reginald Arthur Gaskin, Nichols's manservant from 1924 until Gaskin's death in January 1967. Gaskin was a popular character in the book and was included in Nichols' succeeding gardening books.

A second trilogy (1951–1956) began with Merry Hall, documenting Nichols's travails with his extravagant Georgian manor in Agates Lane, Ashtead, Surrey (fictionalised as Meadowstream), where Nichols lived from 1946 to 1956. The books often featured his gifted but laconic gardener "Oldfield". Nichols's final trilogy (1963–1968) chronicled his adapting to a more modest living arrangement, beginning in 1958, in a late 18th-century attached cottage (Sudbrook) at Ham, near Richmond, Surrey. This was Nichols's final home and garden, where he lived for 25 years until his death in 1983.

Nichols wrote on a wide range of subjects, always looking for "the next big thing". He ghostwrote Dame Nellie Melba's 1925 "autobiography" Memories and Melodies (he was at the time her personal secretary, and his 1933 book Evensong was believed to be based on aspects of her life). In 1934, Nichols wrote a bestseller advocating pacifism, Cry Havoc!, but by 1938, he had abandoned his pacifism and supported the Allies in the Second World War. In 1966 he wrote A Case of Human Bondage about the marriage and divorce of writer William Somerset Maugham and his interior-decorator wife, Syrie, which was highly critical of Maugham. Father Figure (1972), in which Nichols described how he tried to murder his alcoholic, abusive father, caused uproar and calls for his prosecution. He was disappointed by the reception of a book of his about spiritualism.

Nichols was also a competent mystery writer. His five detective novels (1954–1960) featured a middle-aged private detective of independent means called Horatio Green.

Apart from authorship, Nichols's main interest was gardening, especially garden design and winter flowers. His many acquaintances in all walks of life included some famous gardeners, such as Constance Spry and Lord Aberconway, President of the Royal Horticultural Society and owner of Bodnant Garden in North Wales.

Nichols made one film appearance, in Glamour (1931), directed by Seymour Hicks and Harry Hughes, playing the small part of the Hon. Richard Wells. The film is now lost.

Personal life
Nichols was at school at Marlborough College before proceeding to Balliol College, Oxford in January 1917. His education was interrupted by military service with the Intelligence section at the War Office, as an instructor to the Officer Cadet Battalion in Cambridge, and as aide-de-camp to Arthur Shipley on the British University Mission to the United States. Nichols then returned to Oxford, where he was President of the Oxford Union and editor of Isis. He was homosexual and is thought to have had a brief affair with the war poet Siegfried Sassoon. Nichols's long-term companion was Cyril Butcher, the main beneficiary of Nichols's will, amounting to £131,750.

Nichols died on 15 September 1983 and his ashes were scattered over St Nicholas' Churchyard, Glatton, Cambridgeshire, England.

Selected bibliography

|-
| style="width:60%; vertical-align:top;"|

Journalism
The Star Spangled Manner (1928), a series of interviews with the great and near-great of the United States

Gardening, homes and restoration
Down the Garden Path (1932) 
A Thatched Roof (1933) 
A Village in a Valley (1934) 
How Does Your Garden Grow? (1935)
Green Grows the City (1939) 
Merry Hall (1951) 
Laughter on the Stairs (1953) 
Sunlight on the Lawn (1956) 
Garden Open Today (1963) 
Forty Favourite Flowers (1964)
The Art of Flower Arrangement (1967)
Garden Open Tomorrow (1968)

Novels
Prelude (1920) (reprinted in 2007 by Kessinger Publishing)
Patchwork (1921)
Self (1922)
Crazy Pavements (1927)
Evensong (1932), filmed in 1934
Revue (1939)

Mysteries
No Man's Street (1954)
The Moonflower (1955) (a.k.a. The Moonflower Murder)
Death to Slow Music (1956)
The Rich Die Hard (1957)
Murder by Request (1960)

Cats
Beverley Nichols' Cats A.B.C. (1960)
Beverley Nichols' Cats X.Y.Z. (1961)

Religion
The Fool Hath Said (1936)
A Pilgrim's Progress (1952)

Spiritualism
Powers That Be (1966)

| valign=top |

Plays
The Stag – produced 1929, published 1933
Avalanche – produced 1931, published 1933
When the Crash Comes – produced & published 1933
Evensong – produced 1932, published 1933
Mesmer – produced 1935, published 1937
Shadow of the Vine – published 1949, produced 1954

Autobiographies
Twenty-Five (1926)
All I Could Never Be (1949)
The Sweet and Twenties (1958)
Father Figure (1972)
Down the Kitchen Sink (1974)
The Unforgiving Minute (1978)

Political
Cry Havoc! (1933)
News of England (1938)
Verdict on India (1944)
Men Do Not Weep (1941) 
Uncle Samsom (1950)

Biography
 Are They The Same at Home? (1927) 61 essays on friendships
A Case of Human Bondage (1966)

Children's Books
The Tree that Sat Down (1945)
The Stream that Stood Still (1948)
The Mountain of Magic (1950)
The Wickedest Witch in the World (1971)

Travel
No Place Like Home (1936)
The Sun in My Eyes (1969)

In collaboration
 Butcher, Cyril. In Extremis, Worst Moments in the Lives of the Famous (1934), with a foreword by Beverley Nichols.
Yours Sincerely (1947), in collaboration with Monica Dickens

References

External links
Beverley Nichols papers, held at University of Delaware
 Beverley Nichols Collection at the Harry Ransom Center
Beverley Nichols: Conserving Moments from His 'Strange and Lovely Life' (online exhibition), at the University of Delaware

1898 births
1983 deaths
Alumni of Balliol College, Oxford
English short story writers
English gardeners
British garden writers
People educated at Marlborough College
Presidents of the Oxford Union
British LGBT dramatists and playwrights
English LGBT novelists
British male dramatists and playwrights
English male short story writers
English male novelists
20th-century English novelists
20th-century English dramatists and playwrights
20th-century British short story writers
20th-century English male writers
20th-century LGBT people
English garden writers